"When It's Over" may refer to:
"When It's Over" (Loverboy song), a 1982 single by Loverboy
"When It's Over" (Sugar Ray song), a 2001 single by Sugar Ray